Takeoka (written:  or ) is a Japanese surname. Notable people with the surname include:

, Japanese television personality and motoring journalist
, Japanese footballer

See also
Takeoka Station, a railway station in Futtsu, Chiba Prefecture, Japan

Japanese-language surnames